Matthew McCauley (July 11, 1850 – October 25, 1930) was the first mayor of the city of Edmonton, and a member of the legislative assemblies of both the Northwest Territories and Alberta.

McCauley was born into a farming family in Sydenham, Canada West (what would become the province of Ontario) to an Irish father and Canadian mother. His restless nature and desire for adventure led him to travel west to Manitoba. In Manitoba, he established a livery business, which he ran until he set off for Edmonton in 1879. He farmed for two years in Fort Saskatchewan before finally moving to Edmonton, where he established the settlement's first livery and cartage business.

Along with a couple prominent Edmonton citizens, he formed an association aimed to restore order in the area, settling many disputes, including during the 1885 Riel Rebellion as its captain. He soon established a school board, recognizing the need for a school, which he served as president and trustee for 18 years.  Shortly before Edmonton was incorporated as a town in 1892, he formed the Board of Trade. Upon the incorporation, he was acclaimed the town's first mayor in 1892, and the next two following years. He did not run for re-election at the end of his third term, opting to run for the seat representing Edmonton on the Territorial Legislature, which he served for six years. Following his defeat he moved to Tofield, Alberta to farm until 1905, when he returned to Edmonton and was elected to the new Legislative Assembly of Alberta as the member for Vermilion. The following year, he resigned his seat to serve as the first warden of the province's first penitentiary. After five years as warden, he moved to British Columbia to fruit farm, but he moved back to Sexsmith, Alberta 13 years later to farm, where he died in 1930.

Early life
Matthew McCauley was born July 11, 1850 in Owen Sound, Ontario to Alexander and Eleanor (née Latimer) McCauley. His father Alexander was an Irish immigrant who was born in Antrim. He moved to Canada at the age of five, and went on to become a successful farmer. Though his early years were described as him being a "typical farm boy" of the time, he received schooling from the Owen Sound Public School. McCauley desired to follow in the footsteps of this father as a farmer after his completing his education, but his restless nature and passion for adventure set him off to the west, where he first set off to Fort Garry (later Winnipeg) in Manitoba.

McCauley established a livery business, the first of the kind in Fort Garry. He married Matilda Benson of Sarnia, Ontario in 1875, and resided in Fort Garry with her for the next four years, where he continued to operate his livery business. After growing restless in Winnipeg in 1879, McCauley sold his business and traveled west, this time to Edmonton. McCauley arrived in Edmonton in the fall of 1879 after 21 days of travelling by ox cart. He purchased a farm in Fort Saskatchewan the following spring, and farmed for two years before moving to Edmonton in 1882. In Edmonton, he opened the town's first livery and cartage business, the Edmonton Cartage Company, and a butcher shop in 1883.

Early activities in Edmonton

Protective Association
McCauley arrived in Edmonton at the time of what has been described "one of the biggest conflicts ever." The Hudson's Bay Company has recently surveyed lots of land that were intended to be sold as property, however word broke out that the particular area of land was the only land surveyed in the entire district. People attracted to the area were unable to afford land, and therefore built shacks. As more claim-jumpers moved in, it was requested that they move three or four miles outwards, but they refused. McCauley sent many urgent messages to Ottawa to settle the dispute in a civil manner, but to no avail. As a result of the government not being able to do anything, and the lack of a law enforcement agency in the town, a group of prominent citizens formed a "Protective Association" as an attempt to restore law and order, to which McCauley was elected its captain.

As captain, McCauley tried hard to settle the dispute and reach a compromise with the claim-jumpers who "had no desire for a peaceful settlement." He was involved in a brief altercation with a claim jumper whom he approached and ordered to move. The man was armed with two revolvers and refused to move, therefore McCauley and his crew jacked the shack off its foundation and sent it down the riverbank.  The Protective Association, however was involved in a legal problems brought up by the claim jumpers, for "willful damage to property." The brief trial resulted in McCauley, as the captain being fined 40 dollars, and six other members of the committee found guilty, but being let off with court costs and an order to replace the damaged property. The Protective Association eventually managed to restore peace and order in Edmonton, and claim jumpers eventually decided that the area was not the place to build on once the land for the townsite was surveyed by the Hudson's Bay Company.

Edmonton School Board

After realizing Edmonton as a suitable place for raising his children, McCauley soon recognized the community's need for a school. McCauley led a group of prominent men and arranged for a school to be built on land donated by the Hudson's Bay Company. The school opened in on January 2, 1882. Three years after the opening of the school, McCauley found himself and a small group of people paying off bills for the school. Initially, McCauley suggested that land owners be taxed with the funds going to the school, but protest followed. McCauley then decided to propose that Edmonton be designated as an official school district by the government in Ottawa, which was voted in favor of following a close vote. The school district was successfully negotiated with Ottawa, and it became the first of its kind in the North-West Territories. Edmonton became known as having the "finest school system in the west of Portage la Prairie" that set an example for many other following cities. McCauley served as chairman of the newly formed School Board from 1885 to 1888, when he stepped down, although he served as a trustee for 18 years following. He was nicknamed "Edmonton's Father of Education" in honour of his efforts to bring an education system to the community.

Rebellion of 1885
During the Riel Rebellion in 1885, news of the Frog Lake Massacre spread to Edmonton, invoking fear to many residents. McCauley, concerned for citizens of the town, quickly responded by organizing a group of men into what was known as the "Home Guard," which formed a sentry that ensured security from possible attacks, until the arrival of additional military protection.

Political career

Mayor of Edmonton
In 1889, McCauley co-founded (with Frank Oliver and John Alexander McDougall) the Edmonton Board of Trade, forerunner to the Chamber of Commerce.

When Edmonton was incorporated as a town on January 9, 1892, it held its first election in 1892 with McCauley acclaimed as mayor as no other candidates had put their names forth. Among his concerns during his first term were to "establish order" among the scattered shacks near the trading post, and widening various streets around the town, in preparation for what he envisioned in the future of Edmonton becoming a "busy metropolitan".

He led the "Rat Creek Rebellion" of 1892 to prevent an important federal office moving to the rival community of South Edmonton (later City of Strathcona). During his first term as mayor, the Canadian government decided to move the Dominion Land Office from Edmonton to Strathcona, which was then a separate community, on the south side of the North Saskatchewan River. When government agents began to carry out the move, citizens quickly set up a resistance. Headed by McCauley and a group of prominent citizens including councillor John Cameron, angry Edmontonians descended on the office, cut the horses loose and tore to pieces the wagon that the officer was packing with records for transportation. The situation escalated quickly, becoming heated. A couple days later Mounties were summoned from Fort Saskatchewan, their nearest headquarters, and McCauley took the mob of armed citizens to the bridge over Rat Creek (on the site of today's Commonwealth Stadium). He stood off the police, and they returned to Fort Saskatchewan requesting instructions. The government reversed its decision to move the office. Instead it simply opened an additional office in South Edmonton. The Mounties refused to try to enforce law and order in Edmonton after this, and the Edmonton Police Service began a month later.

He was re-acclaimed in 1893 and 1894 before stepping aside voluntarily after his third term, never having been contested in an election.

In 1893, he went to Ottawa to enter negotiations with the federal government for a street railway system. McCauley was successful, and the system, which began in 1908, was the first in the west.

He also advocated for federal government assistance in building a railway bridge over the North Saskatchewan River needed for a rail connection between Edmonton and Calgary. The bridge was built in 1900 with the railway being finished in 1902.

McCauley also saw Edmonton's need for a hospital, and established what later became Grey Nuns Hospital, arranging for the Grey Nuns to establish at the town, along with a nurse.

In 1896, McCauley sought election to the Town Council, this time as alderman. He was easily elected, finishing first of eight candidates in an election in which the top six were elected (Block Voting/Multiple non-transferable vote was used in this election). He served a single term, and did not seek re-election the following election.

Territorial and provincial
Following his decision not to run for re-election as mayor in 1893, three years later, McCauley sought to be Edmonton's representative in the North-West Territories Legislature. He was elected with official Patrons of Industry backing. During his term as representative, he worked to upgrade Edmonton's school system, along with upgrading the town's trade industry. He served in this capacity until 1902, when he was defeated in a bid for re-election. During his time, McCauley kept his focus on his development of the school system, introducing a single tax bill intended to give schools boards power to adopt the tax.

In 1901, McCauley sold Edmonton Cartage Company and used the proceeds to buy one thousand acres (4 km²) of farmland at Beaver Lake, near Tofield, Alberta, where he farmed until returning to Edmonton in 1905.  While in Tofield, he married Annie Cookson - his first wife, Matilda, had died in 1896 - with whom he had four children, bringing his total to twelve.

Upon Alberta becoming a province in 1905, McCauley returned to Edmonton and was elected as a Liberal member to the Legislative Assembly of Alberta in the riding of Vermilion in the province's first general election. During his tenure, he had introduced  many bills to the house, and advocated for a university to be founded.

McCauley played a vital role in Edmonton being chosen as the provincial capital city. In a speech, he pointed out the ongoing development at the northern town of Peace River, Alberta, and how Edmonton would be the "logical centre of the province".

Later career

McCauley resigned his seat in the Legislature the following year after he was elected, after his appointment to be warden of the Edmonton Penitentiary, the first of its kind in Alberta. It was said that his reputation of "honesty, fairness and ability to keep law and order" was a contributing factor in his appointment. In the years he served in the capacity, McCauley instituted a number of new practices, including creating labour jobs for prisoners, like producing bricks, concrete, clothing and tools. Prisoners were also to garden to produce their own food, and by the end of his tenure as warden, a coal mine was formed. He was greatly respected amongst his colleagues, and it was said that "he never once had a complaint against him from either staff nor inmates."

McCauley resigned as warden in 1912 to become a fruit farmer in Penticton in the Okanagan valley. After thirteen years farming in Penticton, he moved to Sexsmith, Alberta to farm on a recently bought 1000-acre farm.

Personal life

McCauley married Matilda Benson of Sarnia, Ontario in 1875, in which he would remain married to until her sudden death in 1896. He married once again in 1902, to Annie Cookson, originally from Manchester, England. He had seven children with his first wife Matilda – Alexander, Lilly Bell, Margaret Alberta, Mabel, Maud, Frank and May. With Annie Cookson he had four children, Georgina, John, Raymond and Ada.

McCauley was an active member of the Edmonton community. He served as a director of the Edmonton Agricultural Association for 16 years. The association brought the Edmonton Exhibition to Edmonton, one of the prominent fairs of the west at the time. As telephone service was brought to Edmonton, McCauley was one of the first to receive one installed. His telephone number was #1. When John Hamilton-Gordon, 1st Marquess of Aberdeen and Temair would visit Edmonton for business, McCauley and his wife would usually be the ones to entertain him. Also an avid curler, McCauley was a founder of the Royal Curling Club in Edmonton and led his curling team where he served as a skip. He also enjoyed other sports, including horse carriage racing.

McCauley School was named his honour in 1912, for his work in pioneering the public school board.

Death and legacy
McCauley died in Sexsmith on October 25, 1930 following a long illness. He was survived by his second wife, Annie Cookson, and 11 children and step-children. Upon learning of his death, all school flags in Edmonton were ordered to fly at half-staff. Almost 600 students from McCauley School, which was named in his honour, stood in "solemn salute". McCauley's body was brought back to Edmonton, when he laid in state on October 30 at the First Presbyterian Church, where his funeral services were later conducted. He was interred at the Edmonton Cemetery.

McCauley was often called "Honest Matt McCauley". It was said that he "has a strong personality, high ideals and indomitable will and was generous to a fault." Edmonton's McCauley neighbourhood is named for him. What was known as McCauley Plaza was also built on the site of his home, overlooking the North Saskatchewan River. It has since however been renamed Telus Plaza.

References

Bibliography

External links
Biography of Matthew McCauley in Real Estate Weekly
Edmonton Public Library Biography of McCauley
City of Edmonton biography of McCauley
History of Alberta's early schools

Mayors of Edmonton
1850 births
1930 deaths
Alberta Liberal Party MLAs
Members of the Legislative Assembly of the Northwest Territories
Canadian people of Irish descent
Settlers of Canada
19th-century Canadian politicians
20th-century Canadian politicians